Andrew Fontein (born March 3, 1990, in Las Vegas, Nevada) is an American soccer player who last played as a goalkeeper for Minnesota United.

Career
Fontein signed with the Tampa Bay Rowdies of the North American Soccer League on March 23, 2012, after trialing with the club after leaving his college UC Irvine where he played as the #1 keeper for four seasons. Fontein however did not make his debut for the Rowdies till the 2013 season in which he started for the team in their first game of the season against the Carolina Railhawks on April 6, 2013, in which he managed to keep the clean-sheet as Tampa Bay drew the match 0–0.

Career statistics

Club
Statistics accurate as of April 7, 2013

References

External links 
 Tampa Bay Rowdies Profile.

1990 births
Living people
American soccer players
UC Irvine Anteaters men's soccer players
Tampa Bay Rowdies players
Minnesota United FC (2010–2016) players
Association football goalkeepers
Sportspeople from the Las Vegas Valley
Soccer players from Las Vegas
North American Soccer League players
Vancouver Whitecaps FC draft picks